Shailender Gehlot (born 23 November 1984) is an Indian first-class cricketer who plays for Railways.

References

External links
 

1984 births
Living people
Indian cricketers
Railways cricketers
People from Bhilwara